Chilo plejadellus, the rice stalk borer moth, is a moth in the family Crambidae described by Johann Leopold Theodor Friedrich Zincken in 1821. It is found in North America, including Illinois, Ontario, Quebec, Pennsylvania, Georgia, Louisiana, Wisconsin, Texas and Arkansas.

The wingspan is 20–40 mm. The forewings are white or pale brown with black scales. Forewing edges have a row of metallic-gold scales and black dots. The hindwings are white or pale brown.

The larvae are a minor pest of rice. Early instars enter the rice plant stem by chewing a hole either behind the leaf sheath or near the base of the panicle. Several larvae enter the stem from a single hole. They initially feed on the inner stem tissues but eat into the lower larger part of the stem. Later instars keep feeding on tissue until only a single thin layer of tissue covers a circular hole in the stem above the water line. They overwinter in a rice stubble. Pupation occurs in the spring and adults emerge in May. The larvae are light brown with one dark brown and one light brown stripe along each side of the body. They reach a length of 25–40 mm.

References

Moths described in 1821
Chiloini
Insects of the United States